Pseudiodis is a genus of moths in the family Geometridae.

Species
Pseudiodis albidentula (Hampson 1907)
Pseudiodis unifascia  (Hampson 1891)

References
Natural History Museum Lepidoptera genus database

Geometrinae